State Route 136 (SR 136) is a numbered state highway in Maine, United States. It begins with SR 125 at the junction of U.S. Route 1 (US 1) in Freeport, and travels to Auburn.

Major junctions

References

External links

Floodgap Roadgap's RoadsAroundME: Maine State Route 136

136
Transportation in Androscoggin County, Maine
Transportation in Cumberland County, Maine